The Lampre group is an Italian-based company that specialises in pre-coated steel production. In addition to the main company the group also contains Lamital and Lamifer, as well as a Portuguese subsidiary called Lampre Portugal.

Lampre as a sponsor of cycling
Lampre was the former leading sponsor of a professional Italian cycling team with the same name. Lampre appeared on the cycling jersey of a professional team for the first time in 1991. In 1993, the team won the Milan–San Remo with Maurizio Fondriest, and the overall UCI Road World Cup. In 1999, in partnership with Daikin, Oscar Camenzind wore the World Champion jersey. In 2001, Gilberto Simoni won the Giro d'Italia for Lampre–Daikin. After two seasons in which Lampre was main sponsor of the team driven by Giuseppe Saronni, the Galbusera family decided to amalgamate with other sponsors in order to follow the UCI ProTour project: from the union between the Lampre group and the Saeco group was born team Lampre–Caffita, with champions such as Damiano Cunego and Gilberto Simoni. In 2006 a new partnership started: Fondital became the new main partner of Lampre. Fondital heads a European Group that designs and produces aluminium radiators.

Early 1990s
Lampre first entered cycling in 1991, co-sponsoring the Colnago–Lampre team. They took over the lead name in 1992, until the end of 1995. In 1996, they stopped sponsoring the team, although it continued to race under the name Ceramica Panaria–Vinavil.

Lampre–Daikin
Lampre re-entered cycling in 1999, sponsoring the Italian-based Lampre-Daikin team. Daikin remained a co-sponsor until the end of 2002 at the height of Lance Armstrong's zenith, when Raimondas Rumšas's wife was caught during the Tour de France with performance-enhancing drugs in the front seat of her car.

Lampre in the UCI ProTour

Lampre merged with Saeco at the end of the 2004 season to create a new team ready for the UCI ProTour.

References

External links
 Lampre Group website
 Team Profile
 Lampre distributor in Catalonia (Spain)

Steel companies of Italy
Province of Monza and Brianza
Manufacturing companies established in 1975
1975 establishments in Italy
Italian brands
Companies based in Lombardy
Daikin